Geoservice Ingeniería is a Peruvian firm founded in 1995, which provides engineering and consulting services. It work includes environmental impact assessment (EIA) studies, hydrological studies, construction management, and geotechnical studies.

History
Geoservice Ingeniería started operation in June 1995, to provide services to economic sectors such as mining, energy, and infrastructure.

In December 2006, the company changed its name from Geoservice Ingeniería SRL to Geoservice Ingeniería SAC so that it could have a board of directors.

The firm is run by CEO Miguel De La Torre Sobrevilla, who has worked on engineering dams, foundations, slope stability and geotechnical instrumentation. The firm was awarded in 2009, the ISO 9001:2008 certification in regards to engineering studies services and project activities including design, development and supervision of civil works as well as preparation of environmental studies.

2014-present

Geoservice Ingeniería created the EIA study for Southern Copper Corporation's  Tia Maria mine project.

Southern Copper Corporation received the approval of the EIA on Aug 4th 2014, There were social conflicts in 2011, that put at risk the development of the project.

In September 2014, Geoservice Ingeniería was hired again by Southern Copper Corporation to prepare studies on surface and underground water resources as well as hydraulic infrastructure linked to river Locumba water resources usage planning.

References

External links
Official Homepage

Companies of Peru
Engineering consulting firms